ABB Grain was Australia's largest agribusiness. Founded in 1939, the company was listed on the Australian Securities Exchange until its takeover by Viterra in 2009. For most of its history, the company focused solely on grain accumulation and marketing, but it eventually expanded its focus to other activities, such as grain receival and storage, malting and fertilisers.ABB bought grain from all growing regions in Australia and traded in all grain commodities.

History 
ABB traces its origins to the former Australian Barley Board, and due to the company's expanded operations into different areas, it demutualised to become ABB Grain on 1 July 1999. In 2004, ABB merged with the South Australian storage and handling company AusBulk and the holding company United Grower Holdings. This brought the control of the two major grain handlers, along with several of AusBulk's divisions.

Since its merger with AusBulk, ABB's supply chain has involved operations in storage and handling and logistics. This includes a significant network of silos and export shipping terminals in South Australia and the eastern states of Australia, incorporating joint ownership of Australian Bulk Alliance, or ABA, with Japanese trading company Sumitomo.

ABB's malting division, Joe White Maltings, is Australia's largest producer of malt with the capacity to produce 500,000 tonnes per annum. The eight malting plants located across Australia include the largest malthouse in the southern hemisphere, situated in Perth, Western Australia.

The company also provides rural services including fertiliser and agrichemical supply and wool and livestock activities. The latter have been supported by the acquisitions of Adelaide Wool Company, Wardle Co and Stawool in 2007.

The company also has significant operations in New Zealand focused on the trading and distribution of grains and proteins. In 2007, ABB established a joint venture in Ukraine with French malting company Soufflet to accumulate grain, manage supply chain activities and market grain.

On 19 May 2009 it was announced that ABB would be acquired by Viterra, the largest grain handler in Canada in September 2009, if voted ahead by the shareholders. The Head Office would be relocated to Regina, Saskatchewan, with the worldwide malting headquarters remaining in Adelaide. The two companies together were responsible for 37 percent of the world's exports of wheat, canola and barley.  Managing director Michael Iwaniw resigned on 28 July, and shareholders approved the merger on 9 September.

References

External links 
 Joe White Maltings
 Viterra
 Soufflet

Australian companies established in 1939
Food and drink companies of Australia
Companies based in Adelaide
Food and drink companies established in 1939
Food and drink companies disestablished in 2009
Barley
Grain industry of Australia
Grain companies
Australian companies disestablished in 2009